Dirk Jan Stubbe is a South African politician serving as a Member of the National Assembly for the opposition Democratic Alliance since September 2020, and previously from September 2010 to May 2019. Prior to his tenure in the National Assembly, Stubbe was a Member of the Northern Cape Provincial Legislature.

Career

Northern Cape Provincial Legislature
In May 2009, Stubbe was elected to the Northern Cape Provincial Legislature as a member of the Democratic Alliance. He was the party's caucus leader in the legislature. He resigned from the legislature in September 2010.

National Assembly
On 10 September 2010, Stubbe was sworn in as a Member of the National Assembly, replacing Andrew Louw, who had been redeployed to the provincial legislature. DA parliamentary leader Athol Trollip appointed him as Shadow Minister for State Security. In February 2012, newly elected DA parliamentary leader Lindiwe Mazibuko named him Shadow Deputy Minister of Police. Stubbe was elected to a full term as a Member of Parliament in May 2014. In June 2014, he returned to the position of Shadow Minister of State Security.

As Stubbe was placed low on the DA's national list for the 2019 general election, he did not return to Parliament after the election. Mmusi Maimane resigned from Parliament in October 2019 and the DA nominated him as his successor. He was sworn in on 10 September 2020.

On 5 December 2020, Stubbe was appointed as Shadow Deputy Minister of State Security by John Steenhuisen. He was elected as the DA's provincial finance chairperson on that same day.

References

External links

Mr Dirk Jan Stubbe

Living people
Year of birth missing (living people)
Afrikaner people
People from the Northern Cape
Members of the National Assembly of South Africa
Members of the Northern Cape Provincial Legislature
21st-century South African politicians
Democratic Alliance (South Africa) politicians